9 Puppis is a binary star system in the southern constellation of Puppis. It was originally designated 9 Argus, being part of the now defunct Argo Navis constellation. The system is faintly visible to the naked eye as a point of light with a combined apparent visual magnitude of 5.16. The magnitude difference between the two stars is 0.65. Parallax measurements yield a distance estimate to 9 Puppis of approximately 54 light years from the Sun, with the dynamic and trigonometric parallaxes for the system being in close agreement. It is drifting closer with a systemic radial velocity of –21 km/s.

The binary nature of this system was discovered by S. W. Burnham in 1873, and it now has the discovery code BU 101 (originally: β 101). Early efforts at computing orbital elements were made by Burnham (1894), Aitken (1914), and others. The latest refined elements show an orbital period of 22.7 years with a large eccentricity (ovalness) of 0.74. The orbital plane is highly inclined to the line of sight at an angle of 80.4°.

The physical size of the system's semimajor axis is estimated to be .

The stellar classification of the 9 Puppis system is G0V, matching a G-type main-sequence star like the Sun. The dynamic masses of the components are 1.06 and 0.90 times the mass of the Sun, yielding estimated individual stellar classes of G1 for the primary and G9 for the  secondary, respectively. The system has been listed as a probable member of the Ursa Major Moving Group, but was excluded by Soderblom and Mayor (1993) due to low lithium abundance and low X-ray flux. Their age determined from chromospheric heating is around seven billion years.

References

G-type main-sequence stars
Binary stars
Puppis
Puppis, 09
BD-13 2267
064096
038382
3064
J07514629-1353526